THF may refer to:

 Tetrahydrofuran
 Tetrahydrofolate
 Tremendously high frequency
 Trust House Forte, a UK-based hotel and catering group
 THF, the former IATA airport code for Tempelhof International Airport